Brezno is a town in central Slovakia.

Brezno may also refer to:

Czech Republic
Březno (disambiguation)

Slovenia
Brezno, Laško, a village in the Municipality of Laško
Brezno, Podvelka, a village in the Municipality of Podvelka